SMSO may refer to:
 Sayyidina 'Othman Secondary School, secondary school in Tutong, Brunei
 Southern Miss Symphony Orchestra, orchestra in Mississippi, United States